Abhinay Deo is an Indian filmmaker.

Life and career

Abhinay Deo is an Indian commercial director turned film director. Abhinay's first movie was Game (2011).  His second, Delhi Belly, was released on 1 July 2011. Before directing commercials, he graduated with a degree in architecture.

His parents are the actors Ramesh Deo and Seema Deo. He is younger brother of Ajinkya Deo, who is also a well-known actor in Marathi films.

He made his mainstream directorial debut through Game and followed it with  Delhi Belly, for which he received Filmfare Award for Best Debut Director and is also known for directing works such as Game (2011) and Force 2 (2016). In 2018 he made comedy thriller Blackmail with Irfan Khan. After making several thrillers he moved to different genre by making Doosra.

Filmography
As Director

References

External links
 

Living people
Hindi-language film directors
Film directors from Mumbai
Indian advertising directors
Filmfare Awards winners
Year of birth missing (living people)
21st-century Indian film directors